The 1948 Úrvalsdeild is an season of top-flight Icelandic football.

Overview
It was contested by 4 teams, and KR won the championship. KR's Ólafur Hannesson was the top scorer with 4 goals.

League standings

Results

References

Úrvalsdeild karla (football) seasons
Iceland
Iceland
Urvalsdeild